Al Qafr District is a district of the Ibb Governorate, Yemen. As of 2003, the district had a population of 103,272 inhabitants.

References

Districts of Ibb Governorate
Al Qafr District